Newberry is a surname, a variant of Newbury. Notable people with the surname include:
 Booker Newberry III (born 1956), American singer and keyboardist
 Brennan Newberry (born, 1990), American professional stock car racing driver
 Brian Newberry (born 1971), American politician and member of the Rhode Island House of Representatives
 Christian Newberry (born 1968), British competitive figure skater
 Clare Turlay Newberry (1903–1970), American author and illustrator of children's books
 Claude Newberry (1888–1916), South African cricketer
 Dan Newberry, American politician and member of the Oklahoma Senate
 Fannie Ellsworth Newberry (1848–1942), American writer of girls' stories
 George Newberry (1917–1978), British track cyclist
 Graham Newberry (born 1998), British figure skater
 Guillermo Newberry (born 1898), Argentine sprinter
 Hazel Newberry, British dancer
 Jake Newberry (born 1994), American baseball player
 Janet Newberry (born 1953), American tennis player
 Jared Newberry (born 1981), American footballer
 Jeremy Newberry (born 1976), American footballer
 Jessica Newberry-Ransehousen (born 1938), American equestrian
 Jim Newberry, Mayor of Lexington, Kentucky
 Jimmy Newberry, Negro league baseball player
 John Newberry (ice hockey) (born 1962), Canadian ice hockey player
 John Josiah Newberry (1877–1954), founder of store chain J. J. Newberry
 John Stoughton Newberry (1826–1887), American politician
 John Strong Newberry (1822–1892), American geologist, physician and explorer
 Luke Newberry (born 1990), English actor
 Michael Newberry, American painter
 Percy Newberry (1869–1949), British Egyptologist
 Sterling Newberry (1915–2017), American inventor and microscopist
 Thomas Newberry (1811–1901), English Bible scholar
 Tom Newberry (born 1962), American footballer
 Tommy Newberry, American author and success coach
 Truman Handy Newberry (1864–1945), American businessman and politician
 Walter C. Newberry (1835–1912), American politician
 Walter Loomis Newberry (1804–1868), American businessman and philanthropist

See also 
 Newbery
 Newbury (disambiguation)
 Newbury (surname)

English toponymic surnames

de:Newberry
fr:Newberry
nl:Newberry
pl:Newberry
pt:Newberry
sv:Newberry
vo:Newberry